The fifth HMS Valorous, ex-HMS Montrose, was a V-class flotilla leader of the British Royal Navy that saw service in World War I, the Russian Civil War, and World War II.

Construction and commissioning
In early 1916, the British Royal Navy had a requirement for a destroyer leader suitable for leading the new, fast, R-class destroyers. To meet this requirement, the Director of Naval Construction prepared the design of a new class of ships, smaller and cheaper than the existing Marksman and es, but still capable of accommodating the additional staff required to command the destroyer flotilla and carrying the same armament.

The ship's machinery was based on that of the R-class destroyers, with three Yarrow boilers feeding Brown-Curtiss geared steam turbines which drove two propeller shafts.

Valorous main gun armament was four 4 inch (102 mm) QF Mk V guns on CP.II mountings, with two mounts forward and two aft in superimposed positions. A single QF 3-inch (76 mm) 20 cwt anti-aircraft gun was mounted aft of the second funnel. Aft of the 3-inch gun, she carried four 21 inch (533 mm) torpedo tubes mounted in pairs on the ship's centre-line.

The ship was ordered in April 1916, and was initially intended to be named HMS Montrose; her keel was laid down on 25 May 1916 by William Denny and Brothers of Dumbarton, Scotland. On 29 September 1916 she was renamed HMS Valorous and she was launched under that name on 8 May 1917. She was commissioned on 6 August and completed on 21 August 1917.

Conversion
In 1936, the Admiralty recognised that the Royal Navy had a shortage of escort ships with good anti-aircraft armament, suitable for operations along Great Britain's eastern coast. As well as building a new class of escort destroyers designed for this role (the  escort destroyers), it was decided to convert a number of old destroyers of the V and W classes, now obsolete as fleet destroyers, to perform a similar role. This programme became known as the "Wair" conversions. The conversion involved the replacement of the ship's entire armament. Two twin QF 4 inch Mk XVI naval gun anti-aircraft mounts were fitted, with a modern fire control system mounted on a new superstructure to direct their fire. Two quadruple Vickers .50 machine gun mounts provided close-in anti-aircraft armament. Modern sonar, and a relatively powerful depth-charge outfit of 30 depth charges provided the ship's anti-submarine equipment. No torpedo tubes were fitted. Valorous was converted to "Wair" standard between November 1938 and June 1939.

Service history

World War I
Upon completion, Valorous entered service with the 11th Destroyer Flotilla operating with the Grand Fleet during World War I. Before the Armistice with Germany ended the war on 11 November 1918, she had been converted for use as  minelayer.

Interwar
In March 1919, the destroyer flotillas of the Royal Navy were re-organised, with Valorous joining the newly established 1st Destroyer Flotilla of what would become the Atlantic Fleet as one of two leaders. In May 1919, Valorous was deployed with the rest of the 1st Flotilla to the Baltic Sea to participate in the British campaign there against Bolshevik forces during the Russian Civil War. On 27 July 1919, the Bolshevik   attempted to torpedo Valorous and the destroyer . The two British ships retaliated with depth charges, severely damaging the Bolshevik submarine, which managed to escape and make it back to base at Kronstadt. The 1st Flotilla returned home from the Baltic in August, but on reaching their home base of Port Edgar, the men of the unit only received 16 days home leave rather than the promised 21 days. When, on 12 October, the flotilla was ordered to prepare to return to the Baltic, between 150 and 200 men from the ships of the flotilla, including Valorous, deserted. The missing crewmen were replaced by men from the battleships of the Atlantic Fleet, allowing some of the flotilla to sail on 14 October.

On 4 November 1919, the German-backed West Russian Volunteer Army attacked Liepāja in Latvia. By the time the fighting at Liepāja ended on 14 November, Valorous had completely exhausted her ammunition.

On 1 April 1920, she transferred to the 4th Destroyer Flotilla, where she operated until 2 February 1923, when she joined the 2nd Destroyer Flotilla. In July 1926, she was recommissioned to serve as emergency destroyer at Rosyth, with the task continuing until December that year. From February 1927, Valorous was laid up at Sheerness, where she was refitted from March to June 1927. Valorous remained in reserve at Sheerness until April 1932, when she recommissioned into the 2nd Destroyer Flotilla of the Atlantic Fleet, replacing . She served with the 2nd Flotilla until August 1935, and in September she joined the 19th Destroyer Flotilla based at Malta, newly set up as a response to the Abyssinia Crisis. Valorous suffered serious engine room flooding during operations in September 1935, and was under repair at Malta until March 1936, and was then docked at Sheerness from April to June 1936. Following the outbreak of the Spanish Civil War, Valorous operated off the northern coat of Spain from 28 July to 28 August 1936.

On 20 October 1936, Valorous was reduced to reserve at Chatham. In 1938, the Royal Navy selected Valorous for conversion into an anti-aircraft escort under the naval rearmament programme, and she entered Chatham Dockyard for the required work on 30 October that year. Upon its completion, she was recommissioned on 30 June 1939, serving as a training ship for the Clyde division of the Royal Naval Volunteer Reserve. In August 1939 she was assigned to the escort force at Rosyth, Scotland.

World War II

When the United Kingdom entered World War II in September 1939, Valorous took up convoy defence duties  in the North Sea and Northwestern Approaches with Rosyth Force. In January 1940 her duties were expanded to include the defence of convoys along the east coast of Great Britain and in the English Channel. She did not take part in the evacuation of Allied troops from Dunkirk, France, remaining on convoy escort duties instead. On 11 June 1940, she was escorting Convoy FN 23 when it came under German air attack and, after a German bomb hit and sank the collier Heworth, rescued Heworths crew.

In July 1940, Valorouss duties expanded again to include anti-invasion patrols. In 1941, after the threat of invasion had subsided, she returned to her convoy escort focus. On 21 June 1941 the flotilla leader rescued the only three survivors of the tanker Vancouver, which had struck a naval mine and caught fire off Sunk Head Buoy, Harwich, with the loss of 45 lives while on a voyage from Shell Haven to Halifax, Yorkshire. Valorous was "adopted" by the civil community of Dewsbury, then in the West Riding of Yorkshire, as the result of a Warship Week National Savings campaign in October 1941.

Valorous interrupted her regular duties in January 1942 to take part in Operation Performance, deploying with the Home Fleet to cover the break-out of merchant ships from Sweden into the North Sea via the Danish Straits. Fitted with a Type 285 fire-control radar for her main armament in 1942 and with Type 286P radar and direction-finding equipment  in 1943–1944, the vessel continued her convoy defense duties through the surrender of Germany in early May 1945, not taking part in any operations related to the Allied invasion of Normandy in the summer of 1944.

After Germany's surrender, Valorous supported reoccupation forces, and on 14 May 1945 joined the destroyer  in escorting minesweepers during minesweeping operations at Kristiansund, Norway.

Decommissioning and disposal
Valorous was decommissioned in 1945 – sources differ on whether she had been deleted from the Royal Navys active list as of July 1945 or stayed in commission until after the surrender of Japan on 15 August 1945 – and placed on the disposal list in 1946. She was sold on 4 March 1947 for scrapping at Thornaby.

Notes

References

Bibliography

External links
 HMS VALOROUS (L 00) – V & W-class Destroyer
 uboat.net HMS Valorous (L 00)

V and W-class destroyers of the Royal Navy
Ships built on the River Clyde
1917 ships
World War I destroyers of the United Kingdom
World War II destroyers of the United Kingdom